Wolfgang Steglich  (born 12 August 1933) is a German chemist .

Life
Wolfgang Steglich was born in Kamenz and studied chemistry at the Technical University of Berlin and later at the Technical University of Munich where he received his PhD in 1960 for work with Friedrich Weygand. Following a postdoc stay with Sir Derek H. R. Barton at the Imperial College London, Wolfgang Steglich completed his habilitation at the Technical University of Munich. After Friedrich Weygand's decease in 1969,

Steglich was in charge of the Weygand chair until he became a full professor at the Technical University of Berlin in 1971. In 1975, he was appointed a professorship at the University of Bonn. He succeeded Rolf Huisgen as head of the organic chemistry department of the University of Munich in 1991. Wolfgang Steglich retired in 2001.

Work
The use of 4-dimethylaminopyridine for esterifications with anhydrides, which is sometimes called the Steglich esterification, his studies on the metabolism of fungi,

and, in collaboration with Timm Anke, the structure eludication and chemical synthesis of the antifungal Strobilurins

that resulted in the industrial development of the novel class of Strobilurin-based crop protection agents

are his main contributions in the field of chemistry.

References

Literature

External links 
 Steglich Alumni Website

1933 births
Living people
20th-century German chemists
Alumni of Imperial College London
Academic staff of the Technical University of Munich
Technical University of Munich alumni
Technical University of Berlin alumni
Academic staff of the Technical University of Berlin
Academic staff of the University of Bonn
University of Bonn alumni
Academic staff of the Ludwig Maximilian University of Munich
Recipients of the Cross of the Order of Merit of the Federal Republic of Germany